Nogometni klub Železničar Maribor, commonly referred to as NK Železničar Maribor or simply Železničar, was a Slovenian football club from Maribor. They qualified for the top division of Slovenian football, the Slovenian PrvaLiga, in the 1992–93 season, but were relegated in their first season, never returning to the top level. They were one of the most successful Slovenian clubs in the Yugoslav era, winning the Slovenian Republic League four times and the Slovenian Republic Cup twice.

History
The club was established in 1927 as a football section of SK Železničar, the railway workers' sports club. They played their first match on 7 August of the same year and won 5–1 against SK Merkur. They joined Slovenian competitions, playing in the Maribor region, where they soon developed a fierce rivalry with I. SSK Maribor.

In the Ljubljana Subassociation League, Železničar finished second in 1934 and 1935, before finally winning their first title in 1937. In the qualifiers for the Yugoslav First League, they lost against SAŠK Sarajevo in the final. Železničar won another title in 1940, this time in a knockout system, beating their rivals I. SSK Maribor 2–1 in the final.
The club was refounded as SFD Železničar after the World War II. In 1946, they finished second behind Lendava, missing promotion to the Yugoslav top division by only two points.

Železničar then stabilised as a mid-table team in the next years, until the league system was changed in 1952. They were located in the East group of the Republic League, where they finished second in 1953 and first in 1954. They have defeated the West group winners Piran (6–0 and 1–2) for the unofficial title and thus qualified for the Croatian-Slovenian League. The team was renamed to ŽNK Maribor and finished tenth, missing out Branik Maribor and ninth spot by one point and was therefore relegated to the Maribor-Varaždin-Celje Zonal League. They have won their first Slovenian Republic Cup in 1957. After three mediocre seasons the team returned to the unified Slovenian Republic League, which was reformed in 1958. In 1960, they have won another Slovenian Republic Cup title.

In December 1960, due to Branik Maribor's food poisoning affair, ŽNK Maribor, holding the first position on the league table, had to give up their place to a newly formed NK Maribor and were relegated. Maribor have won the title with the squad formed mostly of players from the ŽNK. They instantly returned to the Republic League in 1962 and renamed back to NK Železničar Maribor in the same year.

The results soon improved and the club won their third republic title in 1968–69, earning a place in the Yugoslav Second League for the first time in history. They stayed there for three seasons and were relegated in 1971–72 after finishing in 18th place.

They have won another republic title in 1972–73, but lost in the Yugoslav Second League (West) play-ofs against Mercator Ljubljana. Železničar then played several republic seasons without any notable success. In 1981, despite scoring only fourth position, the Football Association of Yugoslavia offered them a place in the Yugoslav Second League, but the club declined promotion due to lack of funds. They were struggling against relegation in the next years, until they were finally relegated to the regional league for the first time in 1987. They stayed there until the breakup of Yugoslavia. Železničar holds a record of 42 played seasons in the Slovenian Republic League.

Železničar was one of the founding members of the Slovenian Second League in 1991. They have immediately finished first and earned a promotion to the first division in the 1991–92 season, managed by their former player Jože Karmel. Železničar played in the 1992–93 Slovenian PrvaLiga, the top level of Slovenian football, but was relegated after finishing 17th, never returning to the top flight again. The club was close to return on several occasions as they refused promotion in 1996, lost the play-offs against Beltinci in the 1997–98 season, and missed a second place by one point in the 1998–99 season. At the beginning of the new century, Železničar became financially unstable and was relegated to the lowest division over the course of several years; from the Second League in 2003 after finishing dead last, from the Slovenian Third League in 2007, having not fulfilled the licence documentation, from the fourth division in 2008, and even from the fifth division in 2014, before ceasing all operations in 2019.

Stadium
The club have built their first ground, Ob Tržaški Cesti Stadium, between 1932 and 1935. After a few seasons on their temporary home ground in Poljane (Železničar lost their original home ground due to the construction of a new bridge in 1963), they moved to the newly built Tabor Sports Park in 1967. The stadium can seat 1,000 spectators, while the overall capacity of the stadium, including the standing area, is around 4,000.

Colours

The traditional colours of the club were blue and white, the colours of the first Yugoslav Railways and then Slovenian Railways, used by all railway clubs in the country.

Honours

Yugoslavia
 Slovenian Republic League
 Winners (4): 1936–37, 1939–40, 1968–69, 1972–73
 Runners-up (5): 1933–34, 1934–35, 1937–38, 1940–41, 1946
 Slovenian Republic Cup
 Winners (2): 1957, 1960

Slovenia
Slovenian Second League
 Winners (1): 1991–92
1. MNZ Maribor (fifth tier)
 Runners-up (1): 2009–10
2. MNZ Maribor (sixth tier)
 Runners-up (1): 2014–15
3. MNZ Maribor (sixth tier)
 Runners-up (1): 2015–16

Domestic league and cup results

In Yugoslavia

In Slovenia

*Best results are highlighted.
*x = Did not qualify

References

External links

Association football clubs established in 1927
Defunct football clubs in Slovenia
Football clubs in Yugoslavia
Sport in Maribor
1927 establishments in Slovenia
Maribor
2019 disestablishments in Slovenia
Association football clubs disestablished in 2019